Burghelea or Burghele is a surname. Notable people with the surname include:

Dan Burghelea (b. 1943), Romanian-American mathematician, academic, and researcher
Theodor Burghele (1905–1977), Romanian surgeon and urologist, President of the Romanian Academy, and Minister of Health.

See also
Burghelea, a village in Ișcălău Commune, Fălești District, Moldova

Romanian-language surnames